Oxford County may refer to:

Oxford County, Ontario, Canada
Oxford County, Maine, U.S.
Oxford County, New Zealand
Oxfordshire, England